The French Theater of Gustav III was a French language theater active in Sweden between 1781 and 1792. The French theater company performed both before the Swedish royal court in the theaters of the royal palaces, as well as before the Swedish public in Stockholm. It is known to have played a significant part in the education of the pioneer generation of actors at the Royal Dramatic Theatre.

The French theater was composed in Paris by Jacques Marie Boutet de Monvel in 1781, when it was engaged by king Gustav III of Sweden to perform before the Swedish royal court. Initially, they performed exclusively for the royal court in the theaters of the royal residences, such as Drottningholm Palace Theatre and Confidencen.

From 1783 onward, they also performed before the Swedish public at Bollhuset. The public performances were, in practice, normally visited exclusively by the upper classes of Stockholm, who were able to understand the French language. The French Theater appeared before the public at Bollhuset on Wednesdays and Fridays, and at the royal court whenever they were commanded to. The company were considered of high quality, and performed the latest plays from Paris.

They shared Bollhuset with the Royal Dramatic Theatre from 1788, but they performed separately and referred to as the "French Theater" and the "Swedish Theater" respectively. The actors of the French Theater were expected by the king to educate Swedish pupils, and many of the first generation of Swedish actors at the Royal Dramatic Theatre were students of the actors at the French Theater, such as Lars Hjortsberg and Fredrica Löf.

The French Theater were dissolved after the death of Gustav III in 1792.

Members
Actors and singers

 Mademoiselle Baron 
 Monsieur Caron
 Francois Chatillon
 Monsieur Clericourt
 Monsieur Cressent 
 Monsieur Delaroche
 Madame Delaroche
 Anne Marie Milan Desguillons
 Joseph Sauze Desguillons
 Elise Du Belloi
 Monsieur Dugay
 Madame Dutillier
 Francois Marie Moussé Félix
 Madame Felix
 Adélaide-Thérèse Feuchère 
 Monsieur Feuillet 
 Sophie Hus
 Jean-Rémy Marcadet
 Marie Louise Marcadet
 Sidonie de Massat
 Monsieur Michu 
 Madame Montrose
 Jacques Marie Boutet de Monvel
 Catherine-Victoire Le Riche de Cléricourt - Monvel
 Monsieur Sainville
 Monsieur Saint-Ange
 Henri O. Dougherthy de la Tour eller Delatour 
 Carlo Uttini
 Monsieur Versenil

Dancers
 Charles Didelot, father of Charles-Louis Didelot
 Louis Frossard
 Marie-Renée Frossard

See also
 La troupe du Roi de Suede
 Du Londel Troupe

References

 Fredrik August Dahlgren: Förteckning öfver svenska skådespel uppförda på Stockholms theatrar 1737-1863 och Kongl. Theatrarnes personal 1773–1863. Med flera anteckningar.
 Nordensvan, Georg, Svensk teater och svenska skådespelare från Gustav III till våra dagar. Förra delen, 1772–1842, Bonnier, Stockholm, 1917 ['Swedish theatre and Swedish actors from Gustav III to our days. First book 1772–1842'] (in Swedish)
 Andersson, Ingvar (red.), Gustavianskt: [1771-1810] : en bokfilm, [Ny utg.], Wahlström & Widstrand, Stockholm, 1979
 Lars Löfgren (2003). Svensk teater. Stockholm: Natur & Kultur. 
 Jonsson, Leif & Ivarsdotter, Anna (red.), Musiken i Sverige. 2, Frihetstid och gustaviansk tid 1720–1810, Fischer, Stockholm, 1993 (Music in Sweden. The age of Liberty and the Gustavian age 1720–1810) (in Swedish)
 Forser, Tomas & Heed, Sven Åke (red.), Ny svensk teaterhistoria. 1, Teater före 1800, Gidlund, Hedemora, 2007 (New Swedish theatre-history. Theatre before 1800) (in Swedish)
 Oscar Levertin: Teater och drama under Gustaf III, Albert Bonniers förlag, Stockholm, Fjärde Upplagan (1920).

18th century in Sweden
18th-century theatre
French comedy troupes
Swedish comedy troupes
Former theatres in Stockholm
1781 establishments in Sweden
1792 disestablishments in Europe
Theatre companies in Sweden
Sweden during the Gustavian era
Court of Gustav III